Valentina Marino (born 5 October 1977) is an Italian rhythmic gymnast. She competed in the women's group all-around event at the 1996 Summer Olympics.

References

External links
 

1977 births
Living people
Italian rhythmic gymnasts
Olympic gymnasts of Italy
Gymnasts at the 1996 Summer Olympics
People from Syracuse, Sicily
Sportspeople from the Province of Syracuse